Franciscus Henricus Johannes Joseph "Frans" Andriessen (2 April 1929 – 22 March 2019) was a Dutch politician of the defunct Catholic People's Party (KVP) and later the Christian Democratic Appeal (CDA) party and businessperson who served as European Commissioner from 6 January 1981 until 6 January 1993.

Andriessen studied Law at the Utrecht University obtaining a Master of Laws degree. Andriessen worked for a construction institute in Utrecht from October 1953 until February 1967 and as CEO from July 1961. Andriessen was elected as a Member of the House of Representatives after the election of 1967 on 23 February 1967 and served as a frontbencher chairing the House Committee for Public Housing Reform and spokesperson for Housing. On 16 August 1971 the Party Leader and Parliamentary leader Gerard Veringa took a medical leave of absence and Andriessen was selected as his interim successor on 16 August 1971. On 28 September 1971 Veringa unexpectedly announced that he was stepping down as Leader and Andriessen was anonymously selected as his permanent successor on 1 October 1971. For the election of 1972 Andriessen served as Lijsttrekker (top candidate) and following a successful cabinet formation with Labour Leader Joop den Uyl formed the Cabinet Den Uyl with Andriessen opting to remain as Parliamentary leader. After the election of 1977 Andriessen was appointed as Minister of Finance in the Cabinet Van Agt I taking office on 19 December 1977. After the election Van Agt returned as a Member of the House of Representatives and became the Parliamentary leader taking office on 8 June 1977 and subsequently resigned from the cabinet on 8 September 1977. Following a successful cabinet formation with Liberal Leader Hans Wiegel Van Agt formed the Cabinet Van Agt I and became Prime Minister of the Netherlands taking office 19 December 1977. On 22 February 1980 Andriessen resigned after disagreeing over new austerity policies. Andriessen continued to be active in politics and was elected as a Member of the Senate after the Senate election of 1980 on 16 September 1980 and served again as a frontbencher and spokesperson for Finances.

In November 1980 Andriessen was nominated as the next European Commissioner in the Thorn Commission, and was given the heavy portfolios of Competition and Parliamentary Relations taking office on 6 January 1981. In December 1984 Andriessen was re-nominated for a second term in the First Delors Commission, and given the portfolios of Agriculture and Fisheries and was appointed as First Vice-President taking office on 6 January 1985. In November 1988 Andriessen was re-nominated for a third term in the Second Delors Commission, and was given the heavy portfolios of External Relations and Trade and kept his position of First Vice-President serving from 6 January 1989 until 6 January 1993.

Andriessen retired from active politics at 62 and became active in the private and public sectors as a corporate and non-profit director and served on several state commissions and councils on behalf of the government and as a occasional diplomat for economic and diplomatic delegations, and worked as a professor of European integration at his alma mater from March 1990 until September 2009. Following his retirement Andriessen continued to be active as a advocate and lobbyist for more European integration. Andriessen was known for his abilities as a skillful negotiator and effective consensus builder and continued to comment on political affairs as a statesman until his is death in March 2019 at the age of 89.

Career

From 1958 to 1967 he sat in the provincial assembly, then was elected to the States-General (Parliament). In 1971 he was elected chairman of the Catholic People’s Party in the lower house. In 1977, he joined Dries van Agt’s centre-Right coalition as finance minister. He sought bigger cuts than his party would accept, and in February 1980 tendered his resignation, precipitating a Cabinet crisis that forced Queen Juliana to interrupt a holiday in Austria. The next month he took a seat in the upper house.

Van Agt nominated him to the European Commission and Andriessen took up his post in January 1981. He secured the competition portfolio, targeting restrictive practices, with the vastly differing prices of new cars in member states a priority. He settled the high-profile IBM case in 1984. But he came under fire from Socialist MEPs for blocking legislation on worker participation after objections from Shell and Unilever, and from British members for suggesting that Ravenscraig steelworks should be closed. With Gaston Thorn stepping down at the end of 1984 Andriessen was canvassed as a potential president of the Commission, but Jacques Delors had the big battalions behind him. Andriessen’s consolation was the vice-presidency and the agriculture portfolio, Brussels' toughest. Within weeks he foiled a French attempt to build an EC "lamb mountain".

Negotiating his first farm budget, the stumbling block was German insistence on higher payments to grow cereals; Andriessen complained that the Germans sided with the British on budgetary discipline, yet wanted him to spend more. Germany vetoed the budget after six attempts to agree it. Autumn 1985 brought the first of several "mutton wars" between Britain and France. Andriessen blamed Britain, accusing Michael Jopling, Minister of Agriculture, of disobeying an "order" to change export arrangements for sheep meat. When French farmers hijacked British lamb consignments, Andriessen suggested an export tax to offset the benefits to British exporters of a weak pound; the Commission overruled him. At the start of 1986 Andriessen recommended a general price freeze for the year. He got his way after a 21-hour negotiating session, and later persuaded member states to accept drastic cuts in milk production. His next target was grain surpluses, outlining a plan to cut production which introduced the concept of "set-aside". This was adopted, but only after he blocked ministers' efforts to sneak grain subsidies into other parts of the budget.

At the start of 1989, Andriessen took the external relations portfolio. The Uruguay Round of GATT talks was at the top of his agenda; as a free-trader he saw a faint hope of breaking the deadlock with America. He began by warning Japan that unless it opened its markets, the EC might refuse it licences for banking in Europe. He also told Britain that if it did not want to engage fully with Europe it could go back to the European Free Trade Association (EFTA).

The fall of the Berlin Wall that autumn gave Andriessen new priorities. He proposed a "European Economic Space", enabling EFTA countries to participate in the single market, while opening the door to countries to the East. Within months, he was suggesting affiliate membership of the EC for former Communist satellites. France distrusted this, but the strategy was carried through, after a scare over whether Romania’s post-Ceaucescu government would allow fair elections.

Andriessen’s final two years in Brussels were dominated by the GATT talks. By 1992 he was claiming that the dispute now hinged on "a couple of million tons of European grain". But that summer he accused America of "harassing" European steel producers for alleged dumping; then France demanded fresh concessions for its farmers. EC-US talks, with Andriessen and Leon Brittan leading for Europe, made no headway. Then farm subsidy negotiations collapsed, with the outgoing Bush administration blaming Europe; Andriessen promised "countermeasures". Ireland’s Agriculture Commissioner Ray McSharry resigned, accusing Delors of going behind his back to sabotage an agreement. Delors faced mutiny from commissioners led by Andriessen and Brittan, who resolved to outvote him on GATT, if necessary forcing his resignation. He backed off, and McSharry returned.

On 20 November 1992, Andriessen and his fellow negotiators finally concluded the GATT agreement on agriculture; the Commission ratified it despite French resistance. Andriessen left Brussels at the turn of the year confident that a full agreement ranging from textiles to intellectual property could be achieved – as it was, enabling the WTO to come into being.

Out of office, he was in demand as one of Europe’s "great and good". This could bring him into trying company: at a symposium in Copenhagen in 1993 he was incandescent when Sir Alan Walters, Margaret Thatcher’s former economic adviser, suggested the Germans could put a portrait of Hitler on a single European currency.

Andriessen was Professor of European Integration at the Rijksuniversiteit, Utrecht, from 1989. He was a Knight of the Order of the Dutch Lion, and held the Grand Cross of the Order of Orange-Nassau.

Personal life
He married Catherine Ten Holter in 1955 ; she survives him with their four children.

Decorations

Honorary degrees

References

External links

Official
  Mr. F.H.J.J. (Frans) Andriessen Parlement & Politiek
  Mr. F.H.J.J. Andriessen (CDA) Eerste Kamer der Staten-Generaal

 
 

 

 
 

 
 

1929 births
2019 deaths
Catholic People's Party politicians
Christian Democratic Appeal politicians
Dutch corporate directors
Dutch European Commissioners
Dutch expatriates in Belgium
Dutch humanitarians
Dutch human rights activists
Dutch legal scholars
Dutch lobbyists
Dutch nonprofit directors
Dutch nonprofit executives
Dutch Roman Catholics
European Union and European integration scholars
European Union lobbyists
First Vice-Presidents of the European Commission
Governmental studies academics
Grand Crosses with Star and Sash of the Order of Merit of the Federal Republic of Germany
Grand Officiers of the Légion d'honneur
Knights Grand Cross of the Order of Orange-Nassau
Knights of the Holy Sepulchre
Knights of the Order of the Netherlands Lion
Leaders of the Catholic People's Party
Members of the House of Representatives (Netherlands)
Members of the Senate (Netherlands)
Ministers of Finance of the Netherlands
Recipients of the Grand Cross of the Order of Leopold II
People from De Bilt
Politicians from Utrecht (city)
Utrecht University alumni
Academic staff of Utrecht University
20th-century Dutch businesspeople
20th-century Dutch educators
20th-century Dutch jurists
20th-century Dutch politicians
21st-century Dutch businesspeople
21st-century Dutch educators
21st-century Dutch jurists
European Commissioners 1981–1985
European Commissioners 1985–1988